South Sinai Hospital, is a private hospital in Sharm El Sheikh, Egypt, that serves both locals and tourists in the South Sinai Governorate.

It is one of the largest hospitals in the area, and covers most major specialties.

References

Hospitals in Egypt
Sharm El Sheikh